The 1966 United States Senate election in Iowa took place on November 8, 1966. Incumbent Republican Senator Jack Miller was re-elected to a second term in office over Democrat E.B. Smith.

Republican primary

Candidates
Herbert F. Hoover
Jack Miller, incumbent Senator since 1961

Results

Following his loss, Hoover registered to run in the general election as the "Iowa Party" candidate.

Democratic primary

Candidates
Gary Cameron
Robert L. Nereim
E.B. Smith, Iowa State University history professor and nominee for U.S. Senate in 1962
Ernest J. Seemann, perennial candidate from Waterloo

Results

General election

Results

See also 
 1966 United States Senate elections

References 

1966
Iowa
United States Senate